The Gentlemen of the College is a Tenor/Bass singing group, and the oldest Tenor/Bass a cappella group  at the College of William & Mary. Founded in 1990 the Gentlemen started out as a men's choir that concentrated in barbershop and traditional pieces—a repertoire that has since evolved to encompass a large selection of contemporary music. Known for their navy blazers, khaki pants, and novelty ties, the Gentlemen perform at the collegiate, local, and national level. The Gentlemen usually field four 'fixed' concerts per year—a Homecoming concert in the Sadler Center, Two "Wren Ten"s on the portico of the Wren Building, and a final concert in Phi Beta Kappa Memorial Hall Additionally, the Gentlemen have performed on national television, at The White House, The Capitol the Waldorf Astoria, and for Queen Elizabeth II of the United Kingdom. The Gentlemen have 17 studio CDs in their discography, having just released their most recent album, Meet Me At Paul's, in 2022.

History

Co-founded in 1990 by Douglas Stambler ('92) and Mike Fitch ('93), the original group had a passion for barbershop. The Gentlemen of the College has been an active part of the William and Mary community for over twenty years. Usually consisting of 10-15 members, The Gentlemen have biannual auditions with the rest of the William and Mary a cappella Council.

Performances
The Gentlemen integrate a lively and humorous performance style with their repertoire—a style shown through their Homecoming and Final concerts. Respectively taking place at the Sadler center and Phi Beta Kappa Memorial Hall concerts are punctuated with skits. A 'final video', a Gentlemen-acted spoof of the year's blockbuster, is shown during final concert.

The Gentlemen perform a 'Wren Ten', an arch sing, once per semester. Congregating on the Wren Portico, the Gentlemen showcase the semester's new songs, introduce the new members, and produce a skit. The Wren Ten performances are sometimes themed—traditionally, the Gentlemen dress up in costumes for their fall Wren 10 (falling usually around Halloween weekend).

The Gentlemen of the College also perform for campus-wide events. Amongst the list, they usually sing at Admitted Students Day, Charter Day, the Yule Log ceremony  and others. They also sing for private events, including Greek life, business meetings, and for special guests.

Uniform
Since its inception, The Gentlemen of the College have maintained a uniform that they wear at all performances. This consists of a navy blazer, a pair of khaki pants, and a novelty "silly" tie. The latter part of this uniform is especially important to the group. It signifies the relaxed, humorous side of the Gentlemen; a balance to the otherwise formal wear. Each member supplies his own novelty tie(s) that he wears for four years, adding to the history of the group. During their holiday performances, the Gentlemen don holiday apparel and winter scarfs.

Discography

Standard repertoire
 Meet Me At Paul's (2022)
 Our Very Best (So Far) (2022)
 Shenanigans (2019)
 College Ruled (2016)
 Night On The Town (2014)
 Blending In (2014)
 Escape From Coney Island (2012)
 Shoes to Fill (2010)
 Untucked (2008)
 Jacket Required (2006)
  The High Road (2004)
  The Ties That Bind (2002)
  No Closure (2000)
  Shades of Khaki (1998)
  Gentlemen Start Your Engines (1996)
  Boomerang Fish (1994)
  Jump the Wall  (1992)

Holiday repertoire
 I'll Be Home for Christmas (2012)
 Christmas Soup (2007)
  The Gentlemen's First Christmas (2001)

References

External links
 The Gentlemen of the College Website

College of William & Mary student life
Musical groups established in 1990
Collegiate a cappella groups
1990 establishments in Virginia